Montemarzino is a comune (municipality) in the Province of Alessandria in the Italian region Piedmont, located about  east of Turin and about  east of Alessandria.

Montemarzino borders the following municipalities: Avolasca, Casasco, Momperone, Monleale, Montegioco, Pozzol Groppo, and Volpedo.

History 
Ancient imperial feud of the Oltrepò Pavese, in 1685 it was granted to the Spanish branch of the Spinola family, marquises of los Balbases, dukes of Severino and Sesto, lords of Casalnoceto, Rosano and Barisonzo. Governed with a feudal system by the marquises Paolo Vincenzo called Ambrogio (1685-99) and by Carlo Filippo Antonio (1699-1721), Ambrogio II Gaetano (1721-1724), in 1753 Gioacchino ceded the feudal state to the Savoys.

References

Cities and towns in Piedmont